Gadibidi Aliya is a 1995 Indian Kannada-language comedy drama film, directed by Sai Prakash and produced by K. Raghava Rao. This film stars Shiva Rajkumar in a dual role, Malashri and Mohini whilst Jayamala and Srinath play other pivotal roles.

The original score and soundtrack was composed by Koti for the lyrics of R. N. Jayagopal. The film is a remake of Telugu film Allari Alludu (1993), starring Nagarjuna, Meena and Nagma.

Cast
 Shiva Rajkumar as Shivu and Raj (Double Role)
 Malashri 
 Mohini 
 Jayamala 
 Srinath 
 M N Lakshmi Devi
 Tennis Krishna
 Doddanna
 Dubbing Janaki
 Ramesh Bhat
 Bank Janardhan
 Sathyabhama
 Manju Malini 
 Rajesh 
 Bank suresh 
 Narasimha murthy 
 M. S. Karanth 
 Ananthrao maccheri 
 Agro Chikkanna
 Mysore Ramanand 
 Adugodi srinivas 
 Bharath kumar 
 Honnavalli krishna

Soundtrack
Soundtrack was composed by Raj-Koti. The song "Umma Beku Sai" was remade from Raj-Koti's own composition "Bavalu Sayya" they composed for Telugu film Bava Bavamaridi. Raj-Koti later adapted "Jama Jama Jamaisi" as "Daayi Daayi" for Telugu film Rajasimham.

References

1995 films
1990s Kannada-language films
Kannada remakes of Telugu films
Indian comedy-drama films
Twins in Indian films
Films scored by Koti
Films directed by Sai Prakash
1995 comedy-drama films